Michael Plassmeyer (born November 5, 1996) is an American professional baseball pitcher for the Philadelphia Phillies of Major League Baseball (MLB). He made his MLB debut in 2022.

Amateur career
Plassmeyer attended De Smet Jesuit High School in Creve Coeur, Missouri. He then attended the University of Missouri, where he played college baseball for the Missouri Tigers. During his sophomore year, Plassmeyer was removed from the starting rotation and ended the year with a 4.83 earned run average (ERA) and 54 strikeouts. After the season, he trained with Brian DeLunas, increasing the velocity of his fastball and improving his grip on his curveball. As a junior at Missouri, he pitched to a 5–4 win-loss record with a 3.05 ERA, striking out 103 batters in  innings pitched.

Professional career

Seattle Mariners
The Seattle Mariners selected Plassmeyer in the fourth round of the 2018 MLB draft. He signed and was assigned to the Everett AquaSox, going 0–1 with a 2.25 ERA and 44 strikeouts in 24 innings pitched. He was a 2018 NWL mid-season All Star.

Tampa Bay Rays
The Mariners traded Plassmeyer, Mike Zunino, and Guillermo Heredia to the Tampa Bay Rays in exchange for Mallex Smith and Jake Fraley on November 8, 2018. He began the 2019 season with the Bowling Green Hot Rods, for whom he was 2–1 with a 1.23 ERA. He was a 2019 MiLB organization All Star. He did not play a minor league game in 2020 due to the cancellation of the minor league season caused by the COVID-19 pandemic.

San Francisco Giants
On June 11, 2021, the Rays traded Plassmeyer to the San Francisco Giants in exchange for pitcher Matt Wisler. Playing for the Sacramento River Cats, Plassmeyer worked with pitching coach Garvin Alston to make mechanical adjustments to his pitching motion.

Philadelphia Phillies
The Giants traded Plassmeyer to the Philadelphia Phillies in exchange for Austin Wynns on June 8, 2022. Assigned to the Lehigh Valley IronPigs, Plassmeyer continued working on his mechanical adjustments with IronPigs pitching coach Cesar Ramos.

The Phillies selected Plassmeyer's contract on August 22, 2022, and he was called up to the majors. On August 23 he made his debut, pitching  perfect innings, striking out Austin Romine on three pitches with the bases loaded.

Personal life
Plassmeyer's father, Marty, and older brother, Mitch, both played college baseball as left-handed pitchers. Marty played for Nicholls State University and Mitch played for Bradley University.

References

External links

Living people
1996 births
Baseball players from St. Louis
Major League Baseball pitchers
Philadelphia Phillies players
Missouri Tigers baseball players
Everett AquaSox players
Charlotte Stone Crabs players
Durham Bulls players
Bowling Green Hot Rods players
Montgomery Biscuits players
Richmond Flying Squirrels players
Sacramento River Cats players
Lehigh Valley IronPigs players